Hector William "Hec" Cowan (July 12, 1863 – October 19, 1941) was an American football player and coach, and an ordained Presbyterian minister. He played college football at Princeton University from 1885 to 1889. He was team captain for Princeton and selected to the first College Football All-America Team in 1889. Cowan served as the head football coach at the University of North Carolina at Chapel Hill for two games during the 1888 season and at the University of Kansas from 1894 to 1896, compiling a career coaching record of 18–8–1. He was inducted into the College Football Hall of Fame as a player in 1951.

Playing career
Cowan played football for the Princeton Tigers from 1885 to 1889. While at Princeton, he had several games against Pudge Heffelfinger of Yale who said Cowan had "the strongest shoulders and arms I've ever been up against and his stubby legs drove like pistons when he carried the ball..."

The 1885 season was notable for one of the most celebrated football plays of the 19th century - a 90-yard punt return by Henry "Tillie" Lamar of Princeton in the closing minutes of the game against Yale. In 1889, Princeton was national champion as in '85, and Cowan was selected for the inaugural All-America team.

Coaching career

North Carolina
Cowan was the head football coach at North Carolina for the last two games in their inaugural season of 1888 (i.e. 1889 calendar year). He was the school's first paid coach, and changed the style of play in that section in his two weeks spent training the team.

Ministry
After Cowan left Princeton in 1889 he became an ordained Presbyterian minister at Hope Presbyterian church in St. Joseph, Missouri in 1891. While there the chancellor at the University of Kansas, Francis H. Snow, began making contact with him in an effort to convince him to come to KU and become the new head football coach. KU's very first head football coach, E.M. Hopkins aided in the effort as he was a classmate with Cowan back at Princeton. Cowan was seen as a premiere football coach at the time despite only having coached a few games previously, but he also wanted to continue his ministerial pursuits and made one of his conditions on coming to KU that he be made chapel director at the university as well as professor of physical culture. In addition chancellor Snow promised Cowan a 1-year salary of $1,000 if he were to accept the offer from KU.

Kansas
Cowan was the fourth head football coach at the University of Kansas in Lawrence, Kansas and he held that position for three seasons, from 1894 until 1896. There he coached John H. Outland and future Kansas head football coach, A. R. Kennedy. His overall coaching record at Kansas was 15–7–1.

In February 1894 Cowan agreed to the terms laid out and his $1,000 salary was raised with $400 in donations coming from the faculty at Kansas and the remaining $600 coming from a citizens committee in conjunction with area businessmen interested in athletics. Cowan arrived at KU on March 1, 1894 and thus became the very first paid head football coach in KU history. As a result of him being an ordained Presbyterian minister and his title of chapel director while at KU he was often referred to as Reverend Hector W. Cowan.

Later life and death
Cowan left his job as head coach at Kansas in 1896, but remained as chapel director, and professor of physical culture for 2 more years. Cowan later was replaced in his positions of chapel director and professor of physical culture at KU by Dr. James Naismith in 1898. He moved from Lawrence, Kansas to Spring Hill, Kansas in the summer of 1898 to become the minister of the local Presbyterian church there. In 1905 Cowan moved back to just outside Stamford, New York to take over his parents' dairy farm. He worked the remainder of his life as a dairy farmer from this point on. Cowan returned to KU several times over the years to visit his former players and friends, and was an honored guest of the University of Kansas athletic association at the 1925 Kansas Relays.

Death
Hector died on October 19, 1941 on his farm in Delaware County, New York. He was survived by his wife, Anna Louise Smith (November 3, 1864 – October 20, 1945), four sons, Hector Edmund Cowan (July 2, 1893 – January 2, 1974), Walter Griffen Cowan (June 26, 1895 – July 28, 1982), John Mark Cowan (April 26, 1900 – June 16, 1978) and William Howard Cowan (May 9, 1908 – August 1, 2002), and 3 daughters, Mrs. Helen Louise Leete (August 2, 1897 – September 29, 1992), Mrs. Frances Petit Beddow (November 25, 1901 – July 8, 1998), and Mrs. Annie Smith Turnbull (August 9, 1905 – April 18, 1990).

Head coaching record

Notes

References

External links
 

1863 births
1941 deaths
19th-century players of American football
American football tackles
Kansas Jayhawks football coaches
North Carolina Tar Heels football coaches
Princeton Tigers football players
All-American college football players
College Football Hall of Fame inductees
People from Hobart, New York
People from Lawrence, Kansas
People from Spring Hill, Kansas
Players of American football from New York (state)